Oxyurichthys microlepis, commonly known as the maned goby, is a species of goby native to tropical marine and brackish waters along the coasts of the Indian Ocean from Africa to the western Pacific Ocean where it occurs in estuaries and inshore waters to depths of about . It occurs in the Mekong Delta and is suspected to use the tidal flow up the river to reach as far inland as Cambodia. This species can reach a length of  TL. It is of minor importance to local commercial fisheries and can also be found in the aquarium trade.

References

microlepis
Fish of Africa
Fish of Southeast Asia
Fish of the Pacific Ocean
Fish of the Philippines
Fish of Bangladesh
Fish of Cambodia
Fish of China
Fish of India
Fish of Indonesia
Fish of Japan
Fish of Taiwan
Fish of Thailand
Fish of Vietnam
Taxa named by Pieter Bleeker
Fish described in 1849